Jeremiah Brown (April 14, 1785 – March 2, 1858) was a Whig member of the U.S. House of Representatives from Pennsylvania.

Biography
Jeremiah Brown was born in Little Britain Township, Pennsylvania.  He engaged in milling and agricultural pursuits.  He served as a member of the Pennsylvania House of Representatives in 1826.  He was a delegate to the convention to revise the State constitution in 1836.

Brown was elected as a Whig to the Twenty-seventh and Twenty-eighth Congresses.  He was not a candidate for renomination in 1844.  He served as first associate judge for Lancaster and served from 1851 to 1856.  He died in Goshen, Pennsylvania, in 1858.  Interment in the cemetery adjoining Penn Hill Quaker Meeting House in Little Britain Township.

Sources

The Political Graveyard

1785 births
1858 deaths
Members of the Pennsylvania House of Representatives
Pennsylvania state court judges
Politicians from Lancaster, Pennsylvania
Whig Party members of the United States House of Representatives from Pennsylvania
19th-century American politicians
19th-century American judges